The Faculty of Liberal Arts and Sciences (Smolny College) of Saint Petersburg State University is the first Department in Russia (Saint Petersburg) to be founded upon the principles of liberal education.

History
The Faculty of Liberal Arts and Sciences emerged from Smolny College (officially the Arts and Humanities Program), which was created in 1994 by Saint Petersburg State University in close collaboration with Bard College (U.S.). Bard College's interest in curricular innovation and the reform of international education coincided with the interests of a group of creatively-minded scholars from Saint Petersburg State University.

In the fall of 1997 the Smolny Center announced a program of open courses to be attended by students from SPSU and other St. Petersburg universities. In view of the considerable number of students and professors who responded, showing great interest in liberal education, the Center was transformed into the Program "Arts and Humanities" (Smolny College of Liberal Arts and Sciences) in 1999. The Program accepted its first students in the 1999/2000 academic year.

On February 28, 2011, the Academic Council of Saint Petersburg State University voted to create the Faculty of Liberal Arts and Sciences.

There are approximately 700 students enrolled in the Faculty. Up until 2021 Students who completed the four-year course received a B.A. in liberal arts both from Bard College and from Saint Petersburg State University. Students from Bard and other American colleges who attended Smolny earned Bard College credits.

In 2021, Bard College was declared to be "a threat to the fundamentals of the constitutional order and security of the Russian Federation" by the office of the Prosecutor-General of Russia. Saint Petersburg State University administrators subsequently announced their plan to terminate Smolny's long-term relationship with Bard College.

In October 2022, Saint Petersburg State University decided to discontinue educational program "Liberal Arts and Sciences", and from 2023 admission campaign to open a new program "Arts and Humanities" without any key feature of liberal arts approach, which is perceived by the media as the beginning of the end of the department. The university tries to refute these claims, but unsuccessfully. Many faculty members have already left the university, and a part of them initiated Smolny Beyond Borders Project.

References

External links

Smolny Beyond Borders Project

Educational institutions established in 1999
1999 establishments in Russia
Bard College
Liberal arts colleges
Saint Petersburg State University